Stockholm–Åre 2026 was an unsuccessful bid for the 2026 Winter Olympics by the cities of Stockholm and Åre and the Swedish Olympic Committee.

History
Stockholm withdrew from the 2022 bid, but the Swedish NOC president claimed in December 2014 that Sweden could apply again, given that the IOC wants to reduce the cost of the Games for organisers, which was the problem with the 2022 bid. The Swedish Olympic Committee agreed to conduct a feasibility study on a potential bid for the 2026 Olympics. During the Semi Finals Allocation Drawn for the 2017 Eurovision Song Contest on 31 January, it was announced by Eva-Louise Erlandsson Slorach, President of the City Council in Stockholm, that the host city of the 1912 Summer Olympics would not seek to host the 2026 Winter Games. Despite this, the Swedish Olympic Committee has continued working on the application. While there has been no official commitment from the political parties the SOC keeps hoping to convince the city of Stockholm and other involved municipalities. Thus the revival of the bid to host the Winter Games. Events will be held in Stockholm, Åre, Falun and Sigulda, Latvia. The proposal to include Sigulda is based around the International Olympic Committee's Agenda 2020 initiative to use existing facilities rather than build new ones, and is supported by the Latvian government.  On 11 January 2019 submitting its bid book Stockholm rebrands to jointly  bid with Åre to become Stockholm–Åre 2026. On 16 March 2019 a survey found that 55 percent of Swedes backed the Olympic bid – a huge positive shift. On 9 April the Swedish government supported the candidature and made over 200 necessary guarantees and warranties to the IOC.

Previous bids
Stockholm hosted the 1912 Summer Olympics but has never hosted the Winter Games. Åre has never hosted the Olympics.

Branding
The Candidate City logo was unveiled on 27 November 2018 during its presentation at the ANOC General Assembly in Tokyo, Japan. The logo of its candidature is derived from the Swedish folk design style and colors called the “Kurbits” style. The logo was designed by Anna Ahnborg and Happy F&B. 
The bid book was published and the website was relaunched on 29 January 2019 in keeping with the bid slogan "Made in Sweden".

Venues

Stockholm Cluster
Friends Arena – opening ceremony
Stockholm Olympic Stadium – snowboarding (and possible freestyle big air and aerials)
Tele2 Arena – figure skating, short track (temporary rinks)
Ericsson Globe – main ice hockey venue (renovated)
Scaniarinken – second ice hockey venue (renovated)
Hammarby – alpine skiing (parallel, team)
Gubbängen – curling (in construction)
Barkarby – olympic village and speed skating (new)
 – biathlon, cross-country skiing (new)
 Multiple locations – closing ceremony (local celebrations in Åre/Falun/Sigulda, main event at Kungsträdgården, the main park of Stockholm)

Åre Cluster
Central Åre – alpine skiing, snowboarding/freestyle skiing (cross)
Duved – snowboarding/freestyle skiing (giant slalom/halfpipe/moguls/slopestyle)

Falun Cluster
Lugnet – ski jumping, Nordic combined

Sigulda (Latvia) Cluster
Sigulda – bobsleigh, luge and skeleton

Official Partners
Dohrns
Ericsson
MCI Sweden
Neh
Permobil

References

 
  

2026 Winter Olympics bids
Sport in Stockholm
Sport in Åre
Olympic Games bids by Sweden